
The Double Arrow Lodge (NRHP designation) aka Double Arrow Ranch and Double Arrow Resort, is located about a mile south from the community of Seeley Lake, Montana and likewise from Seeley Lake itself.  The rustic-style lodge building was built during 1929–1930.

It was a stock ranch known as the Corbett Ranch until it was purchased in the 1920s, then was established as a dude ranch in 1929.

See also
National Register of Historic Places listings in Missoula County, Montana

References

Further reading
Cabin Fever, short stories of the Seeley Lake Writers Club, including early history of the Double Arrow Ranch

External links
Double Arrow Lodge, official site

National Register of Historic Places in Missoula County, Montana
Log buildings and structures on the National Register of Historic Places in Montana
Rustic architecture in Montana
Ranches on the National Register of Historic Places in Montana
1930 establishments in Montana
Dude ranches in Montana
Hotel buildings on the National Register of Historic Places in Montana
Buildings and structures completed in 1930